A poetry slam is a competitive art event in which poets perform spoken word poetry before a live audience and a panel of judges. While formats can vary, slams are often loud and lively, with audience participation, cheering and dramatic delivery. Hip-hop music and urban culture are strong influences, and backgrounds of participants tend to be diverse.

Poetry slams began in Chicago in 1984, with the first slam competition designed to move poetry recitals from academia to a popular audience. American poet Marc Smith, believing the poetry scene at the time was "too structured and stuffy", began experimenting by attending open-microphone poetry readings, and then turning them into slams by introducing the element of competition.

The performances at a poetry slam are judged as much on enthusiasm and style as content, and poets may compete as individuals or in teams. The judging is often handled by a panel of judges, typically five, who are usually selected from the audience. Sometimes the poets are judged by audience response.

History

American poet Marc Smith is credited with starting the poetry slam at the Get Me High Lounge in Chicago in November 1984. In July 1986, the original slam moved to its permanent home, the Green Mill Jazz Club. In 1987 the Ann Arbor Poetry Slam was founded by Vince Keuter and eventually made its home at the Heidelberg (moving later 2010, 2013, and 2015 to its new home at Espresso Royale). In August 1988, the first poetry slam held in New York City was hosted by Bob Holman at the Nuyorican Poets Cafe. In 1990, the first National Poetry Slam took place at Fort Mason, San Francisco. This slam included teams from Chicago and San Francisco, and an individual poet from New York. Soon afterward, poetry slam increased popularity allowed some poets to make full-time careers in performance and competition, touring the United States and eventually the world.

In 1999, National Poetry Slam, held in major cities each year, was in Chicago. The event was covered nationally by The New York Times and 60 Minutes (CBS). 60 Minutes taped a 20 segment on slam poetry with live poetry scenes at Chopin Theatre.

In 2001, the grounding of aircraft following the September 11 attacks left a number of performers stranded in cities they had been performing in. After the attacks, a new wave of poetry slam started within San Francisco.

, the National Poetry Slam featured 72 certified teams, culminating in five days of competition.

Today, there are poetry slam competitions in a number of countries around the globe.

Poetry Slam, Inc. used to sanction three major annual poetry competitions (for poets 18+) on a national and international scale: the National Poetry Slam (NPS), the individual World Poetry Slam (iWPS), and the Women of the World Poetry Slam (WoWPS). The last National Poetry Slam took place in Chicago 2018, after which PSi dissolved for financial reasons.

Format
In a poetry slam, members of the audience are chosen by a Master of ceremonies or host to act as judges for the event. In the national slam, there are five judges, but smaller slams generally have three. After each poet performs, each judge awards a score to that poem. Scores generally range between zero and ten. The highest and lowest score are dropped, giving each performance a rating between zero and thirty points.

Before the competition begins, the host will often bring up a "sacrificial" poet, whom the judges will score in order to calibrate their judging.

A single round at a standard slam consists of performances by all eligible poets. Most slams last multiple rounds, and many involve the elimination of lower-scoring poets in successive rounds. An elimination format might run 8-4-2; eight poets in the first round, four in the second, and two in the last. Some slams do not eliminate poets at all. The Green Mill usually runs its slams with six poets in the first round. At the end of the slam, the poet with the highest number of points earned is the winner.

The Boston Poetry Slam  takes a different approach; it uses the 8-4-2 three-round format, but the poets go head-to-head in separate bouts within the round.

Props, costumes, and music are forbidden in slams, which differs greatly from its immediate predecessor, performance poetry. Hedwig Gorski, the founder of performance poetry as a distinct genre, saw props, costumes, and music as essential for a complete theatrical experience while also following theorist Jerzy Grotowski's Poor Theater by blurring lines between the real person, actor, and speakers in scripted literary art. Other rules for slams enforce a time limit of three minutes (and a grace period of ten seconds), after which a poet's score may be docked according to how long the poem exceeded the limit. Many youth slams, however, allow the poets up to three and a half minutes on stage. The slams at the Individual World Poetry Slam and Women of the World Poetry Slam competitions had a 1-minute round, a 2-minute round, a 3-minute round, and a 4-minute round.

Competition types

In an "Open Slam", the most common slam type, competition is open to all who wish to compete, given the number of slots available. In an "Invitational Slam", only those invited to do so may compete.

In 1998, spoken word poet Emanuel Xavier created the House of Xavier and the Glam Slam, an annual downtown arts event staged at the Nuyorican Poets Cafe (and later at the Bowery Poetry Club). The fusion of ball culture and poetry slam competitions featured four open categories such as Best Erotic Poem in Sexy Underwear or Lingerie, Best Verbal Vogue and Best Love Poem in Fire Engine Red (alternately Best Bitter Break Up Poem in Blue). Winners of each category received a trophy and went on to compete for the Grand Prize title of Glam Slam Champion. The annual competition was first held in New York City and then London until 2010.

Poetry Slam, Inc., holds several national and international competitions, including the Individual World Poetry Slam, the National Poetry Slam and The Women of the World Poetry Slam. The current (2013) IWPS champion is Ed Mabrey. Ed Mabrey is the only three-time IWPS champion in the history of the event. The current (2013) National Poetry Slam Team champions are Slam New Orleans (SNO), who have won the competition for the second year in a row. The current (2014) Women of the World Poetry Slam Champion is Dominique Christina.

From 10 to 11 December 2016 Salzburg, Austria, held a world-record poetry slam competition (28 hours of classic slam poetry) and broke the so-far-record of Nuremberg, Germany (25 hours), by Michl Jakob. The winner of the competition (Friedrich Herrmann) scored one point better in the finals than the second ranked (Darryl Kiermeier). The event was organized by Lukas Wagner (Slamlabor) and took place in the SN-Saal of the Salzburger Nachrichten.

Similar to the House of Xavier's Glam Slam, a "Theme Slam" is one in which all performances must conform to a specified theme, genre, or formal constraint. Themes may include Nerd, Erotica, Queer, Improv, or other conceptual limitations. In theme slams, poets can sometimes be allowed to break "traditional" slam rules. For instance, they sometimes allow performance of work by another poet (e.g. the "Dead Poet Slam", in which all work must be by a deceased poet). They can also allow changes on the restrictions on costumes or props (e.g. the Swedish "Triathlon" slams that allow for a poet, musician, and dancer to all take the stage at the same time), changing the judging structure (e.g. having a specific guest judge), or changing the time limits (e.g. a "1-2-3" slam with three rounds of one minute, two minutes, and three minutes, respectively).

Although theme slams may seem restricting in nature, slam venues frequently use them to advocate participation by particular and perhaps underrepresented demographics (which vary from slam to slam), like younger poets and women.

Poem
Poetry slams can feature a broad range of voices, styles, cultural traditions, and approaches to writing and performance. The originator of performance poetry, Hedwig Gorski, credits slam poetry for carrying on the poetics of ancient oral poetry designed to grab attention in barrooms and public squares.
 
Some poets are closely associated with the vocal delivery style found in hip-hop music and draw heavily on the tradition of dub poetry, a rhythmic and politicized genre belonging to black and particularly West Indian culture. Others employ an unrhyming narrative formula. Some use traditional theatrical devices including shifting voices and tones, while others may recite an entire poem in ironic monotone. Some poets use nothing but their words to deliver a poem, while others stretch the boundaries of the format, tap-dancing or beatboxing or using highly choreographed movements.

What is a dominant / successful style one year may not be passed to the next. Cristin O'Keefe Aptowicz, slam poet and author of Words In Your Face: A Guided Tour Through Twenty Years of the New York City Poetry Slam, was quoted in an interview on the Best American Poetry blog as saying:

One of the more interesting end products (to me, at least) of this constant shifting is that poets in the slam always worry that something—a style, a project, a poet—will become so dominant that it will kill the scene, but it never does. Ranting hipsters, freestyle rappers, bohemian drifters, proto-comedians, mystical shamans and gothy punks have all had their time at the top of the slam food chain, but in the end, something different always comes along and challenges the poets to try something new.

One of the goals of a poetry slam is to challenge the authority of anyone who claims absolute authority over literary value. No poet is beyond critique, as everyone is dependent upon the goodwill of the audience. Since only the poets with the best cumulative scores advance to the final round of the night, the structure assures that the audience gets to choose from whom they will hear more poetry. Audience members furthermore become part of each poem's presence, thus breaking down the barriers between poet/performer, critic, and audience.

Bob Holman, a poetry activist and former slammaster of the Nuyorican Poets Cafe, once called the movement "the democratization of verse". In 2005, Holman was also quoted as saying: "The spoken word revolution is led a lot by women and by poets of color. It gives a depth to the nation's dialogue that you don't hear on the floor of Congress. I want a floor of Congress to look more like a National Poetry Slam. That would make me happy."

Criticism
At the 1993 National Poetry Slam in San Francisco, a participating team from Canada (Kedrick James, Alex Ferguson and John Sobol) wrote, printed and circulated an instant broadside titled Like Lambs to the Slammer, that criticized what they perceived as the complacency, conformity, and calculated tear-jerking endemic to the poetry slam scene. Over time, slam poetry has been criticized for lacking depth and for its features, i.e., "slam voice," which may limit the range of emotion it can express.

In an interview in the Paris Review, literary critic Harold Bloom wrote

I can't bear these accounts I read in the Times and elsewhere of these poetry slams, in which various young men and women in various late-spots are declaiming rant and nonsense at each other. The whole thing is judged by an applause meter which is actually not there, but might as well be. This isn't even silly; it is the death of art.

Poet and lead singer of King Missile, John S. Hall, has also long been a vocal opponent, taking issue with such factors as its inherently competitive nature and what he considers its lack of stylistic diversity. He recalls seeing his first slam, at the Nuyorican Poets Café: "...I hated it. And it made me really uncomfortable and ... it was very much like a sport, and I was interested in poetry in large part because it was like the antithesis of sports. ... [I]t seemed to me like a very macho, masculine form of poetry and not at all what I was interested in."

The poet Tim Clare offers a "for and against" account of the phenomenon in Slam: A Poetic Dialogue.

Ironically, slam poetry movement founder Marc Smith has been critical of the commercially successful Def Poetry television and Broadway live stage shows produced by Russell Simmons, decrying it as "an exploitive entertainment [program that] diminished the value and aesthetic of performance poetry".

International awards and Poetry Slam World Cup
At European level, the European Poetry Slam Championship (or European Slampionship) takes place every year.

The Poetry Slam World Cup (Coupe du Monde de Slam, organised in France) also takes place every year. In 2022, Italy won the XVI Poetry Slam World Cup for the second time, represented by performance artist, writer, poet, and actor Lorenzo Maragoni, member of the artistic collective WOW - Incendi Spontanei, same as the former world champion Giuliano Logos.

Academia
As of 2011, four poets who have competed at National Poetry Slam have won National Endowment of the Arts (NEA) Fellowships for Literature:
 Hal Sirowitz (who was on the Nuyorican Poets Cafe Poetry Slam team in 1993) won an NEA Fellowship in Poetry in 1994
 Jeffrey McDaniel (who was on numerous DC and California slam teams in the mid to late 1990s) won an NEA Fellowship in Poetry in 2003
 Cristin O'Keefe Aptowicz (who was on the NYC-Urbana Poetry Slam team in 1998, 2001, 2003 and 2010) won an NEA Fellowship in Poetry in 2011

As of 2017, one poet who has competed at National Poetry Slam has won the Pulitzer Prize for Poetry: Tyehimba Jess, who competed as a part of Chicago's Green Mill team twice.

A number of poets belong to both academia and slam: 
 Jeffrey McDaniel slammed on several poetry slam teams, and has since published several books and currently teaches at Sarah Lawrence College. 
 Patricia Smith, a four-time national slam champion, went on to win several prestigious literary awards, including a Guggenheim Fellowship and an NEA Fellowship, and being inducted into the International Literary Hall of Fame for Writers of African Descent in 2006. 
 Bob Holman founded the Nuyorican Poetry Slam has taught for years at the New School, Bard, Columbia and NYU. Craig Arnold won the Yale Series of Younger Poets Competition and has competed at slams. 
 Kip Fulbeck, a professor of art at the University of California, Santa Barbara competed in slam in the early-1990s and initiated the first spoken word course to be taught as part of a college art program's core curriculum. 
 Javon Johnson was national slam poetry champion in 2003 and 2004, wrote his dissertation on slam poetry and published an article in text and performance quarterly about black masculinity and sexism in the slam community. 
 Susan Somers-Willett wrote the book The Cultural Politics of Slam Poetry, exploring the relationships between slam, identity, and politics. 
 Karyna McGlynn has devoted much attention to the merging of the poetry slam community and the academic community in her works.

Henry S. Taylor, winner of the 1985 Pulitzer Prize for Poetry, competed in the 1997 National Poetry Slam as an individual and placed 75th out of 150.

While slam poetry has often been ignored in traditional higher learning institutions, it slowly is finding its way into courses and programs of study. For example, at Berklee College of Music, in Boston, slam poetry is now available as a Minor course of study.

Youth movement
Slam poetry has found popularity as a form of self-expression among many teenagers. Young Chicago Authors (YCA) provides workshops, mentoring, and competition opportunities to youth in the Chicago area. Every year YCA presents Louder Than a Bomb, the world's largest team-based youth slam and subject of a documentary by the same name. San Francisco-based a non-profit organization Youth Speaks Inc has also been running the Brave New Voices poetry festival since 1998. The youth poetry slam movement was the focus of a documentary film series produced by HBO and released in 2009. It featured poets from Youth Speaks, Urban Word, Louder than a Bomb and other related youth poetry slam organizations.

In a 2005 interview, one of slam's best known poets Saul Williams praised the youth poetry slam movement, explaining:

In 2012, more than 12,000 young people took part in an England-wide youth slam Shake the Dust, organized by Apples and Snakes as part of the London 2012 Festival. An Open Letter to Honey Singh, a rap video featuring Rene Sharanya Verma performing at Delhi Poetry Slam, went viral on YouTube receiving over 1.5 million hits.

In Africa
In 2017 poet Malika Outtara estimated that there were only fifteen African women slam poets in total.

Burkina Faso
One of the most notable figures in the slam scene in Burkina Faso is Malika Outtara. In 2019 she set up the Slamazone Foundation of which she is President, in order to fund raise for social issues in her country.

Egypt
Slam Poetry has been in Egypt since the twentieth century and was introduced by Hussain Shafiq al-Misry. According to al-Misry, having a variety jobs gave him the experience to understand the struggles of Egyptian people in different classes of life. He had good knowledge of Arabic literature, grammar and some commonly used foreign words as well as slang; which he used to form Halamantishi poetry. Muhammad Ragab Bayyoumi in 1986 wrote an article entitled Hussein Shafiq al-Misry: Ustaz la Tilmeeth lah" (Hussein Shafiq al-Misry: A Teacher with No Student of His) in which he introduced al-Misry's poems and explained al-Misry's literary poetry techniques. In Egypt Performance Poetry is new in popularity, the term "Ash-Shi'r al-Mu'adda" was recently introduced as the term for performance poetry. Poets such as  Bayram At-Tunisi, Ahmad Rami, and Kamel Ash-Shennawy paved the way after al-Misry with lyrical slam poems that use a melodic rhythm to attract the audience.

In Japan
In Japan, Katsunori Kusunoki, a professor of communications at Toyo University, found a way to incorporate slam poetry into his students’ lives; allowing them to showcase their competitiveness and love of poetry by putting together “poetry boxing” matches. Kusunoki created annual “poetry boxing” tournaments in order to provide a medium for expression and social interaction . The rules are “16 boxers face off in pairs in competitions of stand-up verse that last for three minutes. Winners compete in series of challenges such as timed presentation and a round of improvised jousting.” A master of ceremonies adds to the event by providing nicknames for the competitors. Kusunoki's goal was to try to get his students to open up by breaking language barriers and expressing themselves.

See also

References

Bibliography

External links

International Poetry Slam Portal (European)
"An Incomplete History of Slam" at e-poets.net
"Verbs On Asphalt: A History of the Nuyorican Poetry Slam"
Documentary Film about the National Poetry Slam
Indiefeed Performance Poetry Channel Nine-Part Podcast Series on the History of the New York City Poetry Slam
DU Poetry - performance poetry and Slam Poetry showcase

 
Performing arts
Contemporary literature
African-American cultural history
African-American culture